The Acer Iconia is a range of tablet computers from Acer Inc. of Taiwan.

Acer presented its first tablet during a global press conference in New York on 23 November 2010. The family includes a big screen smartphone called Iconia Smart. The Iconia series displays utilize Gorilla Glass.

Iconia series

 Iconia Smart –  smartphone/tablet
 Iconia Tab A100 –  Android tablet
 Iconia Tab A110 –  Android tablet
 Iconia Tab A200 –  Android tablet
 Iconia Tab A210 – 10.1-in Android tablet
 Iconia Tab A500 – 10.1-in Android tablet
 Iconia Tab A510 – 10.1-in Android tablet
 Iconia Tab A700 – 10.1-in Android tablet
 Iconia Tab W500 – 10.1-in Windows tablet
 Iconia Tab W510 – Windows tablet
 Iconia Tab W700 – Windows tablet
 Iconia A3 – 10.1-in Android tablet
 Iconia W3 – 8.1-in Windows 8.1 slate PC
 Iconia W4 – 8-in Windows tablet 
 Iconia B1 –  Android tablet (Jelly Bean 4.1.2)
 Iconia One 7, 8 and 10 – ranges of Android tablets with screen sizes 7, 8 and 10 inches

Iconia Smart
This is a tablet with the size of a smartphone:  widescreen with a 21:9 aspect ratio and 1024×480 screen resolution. It runs Android 4.0 Ice Cream Sandwich operating system and it is equipped with a 16 MP camera with LED flash plus a 5 MP front camera for video calls.

Iconia Tab A100
The Iconia Tab A100 tablet is the smallest tablet in the series. It runs Android 3.2 Honeycomb operating system and it has a capacitive touchscreen display with 1024 x 600 pixel of resolution. Iconia supports multiple connectivity options, including Wi-Fi (in the a 101 version) 3G band and GPS. Iconia tab has gyro-sensor, accelerometer and compass. The A100 features a Nvidia Tegra 2 T20 SoC and a primary 5 MP camera with a secondary 2 MP camera.

Acer has released an update for the A100 to Android 4.0.3 Ice Cream Sandwich.

Iconia Tab A110
Released in October 2012, the A110 includes 8 GB of internal flash storage, 1 GB of RAM and a 7-inch 1024×600 TFT multitouch display.  Also includes in a front-facing 2 MP camera. Ships with Android 4.0 but can be upgraded to Android 4.1 (Jelly Bean).

Iconia Tab A200
Similarly equipped as the A500, the A200 is a budget minded tablet that lacks a rear camera and an HDMI port.  Two models offer 8 or 16 GB internal flash storage and 1 GB of DDR2 system memory.  It is equipped with a dual-core Nvidia Tegra 2 SoC and features a 1280×800 screen resolution.  The A200 features a USB and mini-USB input ports, as well as a MicroSD slot. The device shipped with the Android 3.2 (Honeycomb) operating system.

In February 2012, an update to Android 4.0.3 (Ice Cream Sandwich) was made available via over-the-air update, less than a month after the tablet's release.  It comes with Wi-Fi and blue tooth connectivity as well as the standard USB cable connection through the slave USB port which is extra on top of the full sized USB port, allowing direct connection to a PC and a printer or other USB device.

Iconia Tab A210
Released in November 2012, its two models offer 8 or 16 GB and 1 GB of DDR3 system memory. Each features a 10.1 inch 1280×800 TFT display and Nvidia Tegra 3 SoC including a quad core 1.2 GHz CPU. And Graphics Coprocessor ULP High Performance 12-Core NVIDIA GeForce GPU. Also includes in a front-facing 2 MP camera. It ships with Android 4.0, but it can be upgraded to Android 4.1 (Jelly Bean). Average battery Life (in hours) 8 hours, number of USB 2.0 Ports 1- USB 2.0 Port 1- Micro USB 2.0 Port MicroSD memory card up to 32 GB, item dimensions L x W x H 10.20 x 6.90 x 0.48 inches, item weight 1.5 pounds, Wireless Type 802.11bgn Bluetooth® 2.1+EDR Sensors:G-Sensor, Gyroscope

Iconia Tab A500

The Iconia Tab A500 tablet runs Android 3.0 Honeycomb operating system. As of 28 April 2012 the tablet has been updated to Android 4.0 (Ice Cream Sandwich). It is equipped with Nvidia's Tegra 2 processor and is 13.3 mm thick with a 1280×800 screen resolution and 1080p HDMI capacity. It supports Wi-Fi connectivity (The Iconia Tab A501 supports 3G + Wi-Fi connectivity). Iconia Tab A500 tablet also features a 5 MP rear-facing camera plus an HD front-facing camera, for video chat.

Specs:
 TFT LCD display LED backlight 1,280×800 resolution
 Nvidia Tegra 250 1 GHz dual core
1 GB DDR2 memory & SSD 8–32 GB storage, 64 GB storage available in some countries
Android 3.0 Honeycomb, upgradable to Ice Cream Sandwich 4.0.3 since April 2012.
Wi-Fi 802.11 b/g/n and Bluetooth enabled
HDMI and 1× USB 2.0 ports
Li-ion 3-cell battery lasts 8–10 Hours. Standby 12–15 days.

Iconia Tab A501
Similar to the A500, but with 3G.

Iconia Tab A510
The Iconia Tab A510 was shown for the first time at CES 2012. This tablet has been released for pre-order on 22 March 2012.

Specs:
  inch touch screen (max. 10 finger input)
  Nvidia Tegra 3 1.3 GHz quad core
 1 GB DDR2 memory
 32 GB storage
 5 megapixel rear-facing camera
 1 megapixel front-facing camera
 Android 4.0 Ice Cream Sandwich
 Wi-Fi 802.11 b/g/n and Bluetooth 2.1 + EDR
 HDMI and 1× USB 2.0 port
 Capable of HD games

Iconia Tab A511
Similar to the A510, but with 3G.

Iconia Tab A700

A Nvidia Tegra 3 T30 tablet with a WUXGA (1920×1200) resolution.

Iconia Tab A701
A700 with 3G broadband modem.

Iconia Tab 8
The Acer Iconia Tab 8 was announced by Acer on 31 May 2014, as an 8-inch Android tablet featuring an Intel Atom Z3745 processor, 1920x1200 resolution, and 2 GB RAM.

 Iconia Tab 7

Acer Iconia Tab 7 is a 7-inch 3G tablet with Android that have regular phone functionality as well as data transfer. It was announced on 29 April 2014, in New York. The launch begins in May 2014.

Iconia A1-810
In April 2013, Acer announced the first generation Acer A1, which is a 7.9-inch Android tablet with a 1.2 GHz Mediatek quad-core processor and was released in May that same year.

Iconia A1-830
In January 2014, Acer announced the second generation Acer A1, which is a 7.9-inch Android tablet that will be released in February 2014, for $149 in the US.

Iconia A3
Acer Iconia A3 is a 10.1" Android 4.2 Jelly Bean tablet powered by a quad-core Mediatek processor to be released in November 2013 for $249.

Iconia W3
The Acer Iconia W3 was handed out to attendees at the Microsoft Build Conference in June 2013. It was billed as the "world's first 8.1" tablet with Windows 8." It sold for list $379.99 (US) for the 32GB version and $429.99 (US) for the 64 GB version. It has since been superseded by the W4. It has an Intel Atom processor Z2760, and runs Windows 8.1.

Iconia W4
An 8-inch Windows 8.1 tablet unveiled in October 2013 as a followup to the W3. Powered by a 1.8 GHz Intel Bay Trail processor. 32 GB and 64 GB model options. Also has a 5 megapixel rear camera and a 2 megapixel front camera. is available with HDMI port as well as with micro USB socket. Other competitors are the Dell Venue and Lenovo IdeaTab Miix.

Iconia Tab W500
The Iconia Tab W500p runs the Windows operating system, Windows 7 Home Premium to be specific. The tablet is complemented by a full-size chiclet docking keyboard and powered by the AMD Fusion – Brazos chip and features two 1.3 MP cameras. Starting point of the Iconia Tab W500 touch experience is the Acer Ring. It allows to access all features and touch applications pre-loaded. With clear.fi, Acer media sharing system, Iconia Tab W500 can be connected to the home network and can share multimedia contents with other clear.fi enabled devices.

Known Models: W500p-BZ412(C50), -BZ467(C50), -BZ607(C60), -BZ841(C60)

Specs:
 TFT LCD Display LED Backlight 1,280×800 Resolution
AMD Fusion C-50 1GHz dual core CPU or C-60 dual core CPU 1.33GHz
2GB DDR3 onboard memory and SSD 32GB m-SATA upgradeable storage
Windows 7 Home Premium 32-bit OS 
Wi-Fi 802.11 b/g/n & Bluetooth enabled
HDMI, USB 2.0 port
AMD Radeon HD 6250 Graphics
Li-ion 3-cell battery lasts up to 6 hours
Integrated bottom US keyboard Dock

Iconia W510
The Iconia W510 is a convertible laptop running the Windows 8 operating system. Using Intel Atom processor Z2760,  Acer CineCrystal LED-backlit TFT LCD, Bluetooth, Front and Rear-facing Camera, Audio, Video, 64GB storage, Wi-Fi, Touchscreen, Intel Graphics Media Accelerator 3650, Genuine Windows 8 32-bit.

Iconia W700
Iconia W700 is a convertible laptop running the Windows 8 operating system. Bluetooth, Front and Rear-facing Camera, Audio, Video.

Specs:
 Acer CineCrystal LED-backlit TFT LCD
Intel Core i3-2375M
2 GB DDR3 memory and SSD 64 GB storage
Windows 8 Home Premium
Wi-Fi 802.11 b/g/n & Bluetooth enabled
HDMI, USB 2.0 port
Intel HD Graphics 3000
Li-ion 3-cell battery 
Integrated bottom US keyboard Dock

Iconia Tab B1 (1st gen.) 
Acer unveiled the first Iconia B1 in April 2013. It claims that it's a tablet with great specifications for a budget buy; it does keep its word for a decent specification for the price of Rs. 7 999, £99 or US$154. Acer made its first announcement at CES 2013 where it gave a glimpse of its new release of tablets, the Iconia B1 being one of them.

Hardware and design 
The tablet features 1.2 GHz dual core Mediatek processors with a 512 MB RAM and has a 7-inch TFT LCD screen with 1024×600 pixel resolution with a pixel density of approximately 170 ppi. The tablet weighs 320 grams, and has a plastic back cover with a big black bezel. The top of the tablet sports the Acer branding and a VGA camera at the front and there is no rear-facing camera. There is a blue-coloured frame contouring the sides of the tablet.

Also at the back of the tablet, there is an Acer brand mark and speaker grills. There's Micro-USB port located at the bottom, slot for a micro-SD card, and a 3.5 mm headset jack that is at the top. The volume rocker and the power or sleep button is also made up of plastic and is located at the right side of the tablet.

Software and interface 
The operating system on the Iconia B1 is the Google Android 4.1.2 Jelly Bean. It doesn't include a custom skin by Acer though they have tweaked the Notification bar. There are 3 onscreen capacitive buttons – for Home, recent apps and back button. In the quick settings area there are options for GPS, brightness, screen timeout, Screen rotation, Bluetooth, Aeroplane mode, Wi-Fi and shortcut to Settings app which are all located at the top of the notification tray.  Users can add up to five customisable home screens with various app shortcuts and widgets that are available along with the stock Jelly Bean and the ones from the Google Play store. The app-launcher allows users to add six apps at a time.  The downside is that even with Jelly Bean 4.1.2 and a dual core processor there is a noticeable lag while navigating through the home screens or even switching between the apps, the possible reason could be the RAM which is low with 512 MB, the other could be the type of processor and the materials used to design and fabricate it. There is also that rough touch while swiping through the screens could be the type of glass used and the sensitivity of touch while making the touch screen.

Specifications 
 Android Jelly Bean operating system
 Mediatek dual-core 1.2 GHz processor (MTK 8317T)
 7-inch diagonal WSVGA capacitive multitouch screen with 1,024×600 resolution display
 512 MB RAM
 8 GB of internal storage
 Wi-Fi 802.11 b/g/n
 Bluetooth® wireless technology 4.0
 GPS
 3.5-mm headset/headphone/microphone jack
 Internal speaker
 MicroSD™ expansion slot with up to 32 GB support
 Front-facing 0.3-megapixel webcam
 Rechargeable 2,710 mAh battery
 Micro-USB (charging and PC connect) with USB 2.0
 Dimensions: 197.4 mm × 128.5 mm × 11.3 mm
 Weight: 320 g

Iconia Tab B1-720 (3rd gen.) 
On 3 January 2014, Acer launched a new Acer Iconia B1-720 that would be released in the middle of February 2014. It features a new 1.3 GHz processor, and an upgrade to 10-point touch screen. The release price is $129 in the United States.

Iconia One 7 
The Acer Iconia One 7 was launched in June 2014 as an Android 4.4 tablet with an Intel Atom processor, a 7-inch screen and HD display.

The 2015 version retailed for £99 in the UK, with 1GB RAM and 16GB storage. The resolution of the IPS LCD screen was 1200x800, lower than competing tablets such as the Tesco Hudl 2.

In early 2018, the Iconia One 7 was available in two models, designated B1–780 and B1–790. Both have a 1.3GHz MediaTek Cortex-A53 processor, a 1280x720 display, 1GB RAM and 16GB storage.

Iconia One 8 

The Acer Iconia One 8 was released in 2015. It was an Android 5.1 tablet with an 8-inch screen, 1GB RAM and 16GB storage. It had a 5megapixel rear camera and 0.3megapixel front camera.

In early 2018, the Iconia One 8 was available under designation B1–850. This has the same Cortex-A53 processor as the One 7, a 1280x800 display, a 5megapixel rear camera and 2megapixel front camera.

Iconia One 10 
Released in 2017, the Acer Iconia One 10 has a 10.1-inch screen and an initial retail price of £180 in the UK. It offers Android 6.0, front-firing speakers and 5 GHz Wi-Fi.

In early 2018, the Iconia One 10 was available in two base models designated B3–A30 and B3–A40. Both have a 1280x800 screen, 16GB storage and similar cameras to the One 8. The A30 model has the same Cortex-A53 processor as the One 8 and 1GB RAM, while the A40 has a Cortex-A35 processor and 2GB RAM. A "Full HD" variant designated B3–A40 FHD improves the screen resolution to 1920x1200, runs the Cortex-A35 at 1.5GHz instead of 1.3, and has 32GB storage.

Iconia Tab 10 A3-A50 
Acer Iconia Tab 10 has a 10.1-inch screen. It runs Android 7.0. It's being the last Acer Iconia device ever released, unveiled back in May 2017.

Reviews

Initial reactions saw the devices as an attempt to challenge Apple's iPad. Former Acer Chairman  claimed, in an article in Stuffmideast magazine, that Acer's foray into the world of touchscreen tablets would overtake the Apple tablet within the next 2–3 years.

See also
 Comparison of tablet computers

References

 
Android (operating system) devices
2-in-1 PCs
Tablet computers